The 2017 BMW Open was a men's tennis tournament played on outdoor clay courts. It was the 102nd edition of the event, and part of the ATP World Tour 250 series of the 2017 ATP World Tour. It took place at the MTTC Iphitos complex in Munich, Germany, from 1 May until 7 May 2017. Third-seeded Alexander Zverev won the singles title.

Singles main draw entrants

Seeds

 Rankings are as of April 24, 2017.

Other entrants
The following players received wildcards into the main draw:
  Maximilian Marterer
  Daniel Masur
  Casper Ruud

The following players received entry using a protected ranking into the main draw:
  Tommy Haas

The following players received entry from the qualifying draw:
  Yannick Hanfmann
  Jozef Kovalík 
  Guido Pella 
  Cedrik-Marcel Stebe

Withdrawals
Before the tournament
  Adrian Mannarino →replaced by  Nicolás Kicker
  Donald Young →replaced by  Chung Hyeon
  Florian Mayer (late withdrawal) →replaced by  Sergiy Stakhovsky

Doubles main draw entrants

Seeds

 Rankings are as of April 24, 2017.

Other entrants
The following pairs received wildcards into the doubles main draw:
  Matthias Bachinger /  Maximilian Marterer 
  Gero Kretschmer /  Alexander Satschko

Finals

Singles

  Alexander Zverev defeated  Guido Pella 6–4, 6–3.

Doubles

  Juan Sebastián Cabal /  Robert Farah defeated  Jérémy Chardy /  Fabrice Martin 6–3, 6–3.

References

External links
Official website